The  was the seventh season of the nationwide fourth tier of  Japanese football, and the 22nd season since the establishment of Japan Football League.

Postponement of the beginning of the season
On February 27, the opening game and match day 2 were postponed in response to the COVID-19 pandemic.

On March 16, it was announced match day 3 would be postponed. On March 25, it was announced Match day 4, Match day 5 would be postponed.

On April 7, it was announced Match day 6 would also be postponed.

On April 15 it was finally decided that only the second half of the season would be played beginning on the scheduled date, July 18. No relegations happened and the winners and runners-up of the Japanese Regional Series were automatically promoted, meaning that the 2021 season would be held with 17 clubs.

On June 24, the JFL announced new dates. The league match for this season started on July 18. Match days 16 and 17, and each home game opening game were held as a without spectator match.

Clubs

Sixteen clubs featured in this season of Japan Football League. There were some changes: FC Imabari got promoted to J3, after finishing third in 2019, while Ryutsu Keizai Dragons was relegated after playing for five seasons at this level. Matsue City FC, who finished second-last place, were fated to go back to Japanese Regional Leagues as well, but avoided the drop thanks to FC Imabari going up to J3 League.

There are two new clubs in the JFL, debuting at this level after finishing in the top two in the 2019 Japanese Regional Series: Iwaki FC dominated the final stage, while Kochi United SC overcame the other two teams – Ococias Kyoto AC and Fukui United FC – to get the final spot for this seasons JFL.

Personnel and kits

League table

Top scorers
.

Promotion and relegation
Despite the JFL announcing that there would be no promotion or relegation of clubs, the J. League agreed to admit Tegevajaro Miyazaki to the J3 League on November 24, 2020, after Miyazaki finished in the top four positions. Miyazaki ultimately finished runners-up.

FC Tiamo Hirakata and FC Kariya were promoted from the Regional Leagues as Regional Promotion Series champions and runners-up respectively. Kariya returned to the JFL after being relegated back in 2009.

Attendances

23 games played with no spectators due to COVID-19 worldwide pandemic

See also
 Japan Football Association (JFA)
 J.League
 2020 J1 League (I)
 2020 J2 League (II)
 2020 J3 League (III)
 2020 Japanese Regional Leagues (V/VI)
 2020 Fuji Xerox Super Cup (Super Cup)
 2020 Emperor's Cup (National Cup)
 2020 J.League YBC Levain Cup (League Cup)

References

External links
Official website 

Japan Football League seasons
3
JFL